(the port, in Spanish) was a biweekly newspaper published in Pichilemu, Chile, by San Fernando newspaper editor .  was only published in three issues: the first on 16 January and the last on 5 February 1908. It was the first newspaper published in the commune of Pichilemu, and aimed to be an "absolute and exclusive organ to the regional interests of Colchagua, especially [those] of the port of Pichilemu."  included a scientific section written by a physician, chronicles, and literary content such as poems.

History

Ramírez published the first edition of the newspaper on 16 January 1908. It was the first newspaper published in the commune of Pichilemu.

Self-announced in its first edition as a biweekly ("published on Thursdays and Sundays"), regionalist newspaper, editor  stated in an article named  (Our word) in the first edition of the newspaper that "today [16 January 1908] we comply with our promise to create this journalistic paper, absolute and exclusive organ to the regional interests of Colchagua, especially [those] of the port of Pichilemu." Ramírez also stated that "against general customs in all new publications, we are not making here a description of our program of work: facts will prove our participation in the struggle for progress."

The newspaper published poems, a scientific section by collaborator physician Rodríguez Aguirre, and sections of obituaries, chronicles, social life, and in its third edition a section named  (Sensational crimes).

After abandoning El Puerto, Ramírez continued to publish La Provincia in San Fernando and, in later years, published El Progreso (Chimbarongo, February–December 1916) and El Marino, also in Pichilemu, between January and March 1917.

See also 
 El Marino (successor to )

Notes

References

External links

 Digitized numbers at Memoria Pichilemina:
 Number 1
 Number 3

Publications established in 1908
Publications disestablished in 1908
Defunct newspapers published in Chile
Mass media in Pichilemu
1908 establishments in Chile
1908 disestablishments in Chile
Spanish-language newspapers
Newspapers published in Chile